Chemical Bank was a bank with headquarters in New York City from 1824 until 1996. At the end of 1995, Chemical was the third-largest bank in the U.S., with about $182.9 billion in assets and more than 39,000 employees around the world.

Beginning in 1920 and accelerating in the 1980s and 1990s, Chemical was a leading consolidator of the U.S. banking industry, acquiring Chase Manhattan Bank, Manufacturers Hanover, Texas Commerce Bank and Corn Exchange Bank among others.  After 1968, the bank operated as the primary subsidiary of a bank holding company that was eventually renamed Chemical Banking Corporation.

In 1996, Chemical acquired Chase Manhattan Corporation in a merger valued at $10 billion to create the largest financial institution in the United States.  Although Chemical was the acquiring company and the nominal survivor, the merged bank adopted the Chase name, which was considered to be better known, particularly internationally. What was once Chemical forms the core of today's JPMorgan Chase.

Overview of the company

Chemical Bank was the principal operating subsidiary of the Chemical Banking Corporation, a bank holding company.  As of the end of 1995, before its merger with the Chase Manhattan Bank, Chemical was the third-largest bank in the United States by total assets, with $182.9 billion.  The Chemical Banking Corporation was the fifth-largest bank holding company in terms of total assets. It is not to be confused with the totally unrelated entity Chemical Bank and Trust (headquartered in the state of Michigan)  which is currently a division of TCF Financial Corporation but will be the surviving brand in their merger.

Of Chemical's $182.9 billion, the bank held about $82.1 billion of loans, including mortgage loans, other consumer loans, and commercial loans in the U.S. and internationally.  Among Chemical's largest international exposure was to Japan, Germany, and the United Kingdom. The other assets on the bank's balance sheet included cash as well as various debt and equity securities.

Chemical reported record net income of $1.8 billion for 1995.  Chemical's level of capital at the end of 1995 remained strong, with capital adequacy ratios well in excess of regulatory requirements. The Corporation's Tier 1 and Total Capital ratios were 8.5% and 12.1%, respectively.

Chemical was one of the leading banks in the U.S., active both in corporate banking as well as retail banking.  Within retail banking, Chemical provided personal and commercial checking accounts, savings and time deposit accounts, personal loans, consumer financing and mortgage banking as well as trust and estate administration.

Chemical's corporate banking business provided a wide variety business loans, leasing, real estate financing, money transfer and cash management among other services.  Chemical was among the leading bank lenders to small and medium-sized businesses.  Chemical also had a significant presence in investment banking as well as underwriting corporate debt and equity securities.

Lines of business
Before its 1996 merger with Chase, Chemical had two operating segments: the Global Bank and Consumer & Relationship Banking.
 Global Bank The Global Bank served the bank's large corporate clients and was made up of a traditional investment banking division, known as Global Banking & Investment Banking as well as a sales and trading division, known as Global Markets.  Global Banking & Investment Banking performed advisory services such as mergers and acquisitions and restructuring as well as capital raising functions, such as leveraged loan syndication, high yield financing and other debt and equity underwriting.  The bank's private equity and venture capital functions were also housed in this division.  Global Markets was primarily focused on sales and trading activities, foreign exchange dealing; derivatives trading and structuring, risk management and other market related functions.  In 1995, Chemicals Global Bank revenue was roughly balanced between investment banking and markets activities 
 Consumer & Relationship Banking.  Consumer and Relationship Banking was made up of a number of businesses, including consumer banking, commercial banking; credit cards; mortgage banking (and other consumer finance, i.e. – home equity loans, student loans) as well as a number of smaller businesses. Chemical maintained a leading market share position in providing financial services to middle market companies nationally and small businesses in the New York metropolitan area.  This division also included a small private banking business, although Chemical was not a leading player in this market.

Offices
The bank opened its first offices at 216 Broadway in Lower Manhattan in 1824 at the corner of Ann Street.  In 1848, the bank agreed to sell its building to its neighbor Barnum's American Museum (the building collapsed during Barnum's subsequent remodeling) and in 1850 the bank moved into its newly constructed headquarters at 270 Broadway.  Chemical bought additional land next to its building in 1879 and 1887 but its offices remained modest through the start of the 20th century.

In 1907, the bank constructed a new headquarters on the original and adjacent properties at 270 Broadway, with architect Goodhue Livingston of Trowbridge & Livingston.  In 1921, Chemical acquired a 13-story building belonging to the Shoe & Leather Bank on Broadway, next door to and surrounded by its existing properties.  Despite expanding its 1907 headquarters over the years, by the mid-1920s Chemical needed more space to accommodate its growth and reflect its increasing profile.

In 1926, the bank made plans to move again, this time constructing a new six-story building at 165 Broadway, on the corner of Broadway and Cortlandt Street, closer to the Financial District.  Chemical moved in after the building was completed in 1928, and the bank's headquarters remained there for more than five decades.

Under Chairman Donald Platten, Chemical's headquarters was to move to 277 Park Avenue in 1979.  The bank moved across Park Avenue in 1991 to occupy the former headquarters of Manufacturers Hanover Corporation at 270 Park Avenue, which remained the headquarters of Chemical's successor, JPMorgan Chase, until the building was vacated in 2018 in preparation for demolition and construction of a new JPMorgan Chase headquarters on the same site.  JPMorgan Chase would return to 277 Park Avenue in 2000, following the departure of its previous tenant, Donaldson Lufkin & Jenrette.  In 2008, after JPMorgan acquired Bear Stearns, the bank moved its investment banking groups from Chemical's old headquarters to 383 Madison Avenue. After the old 270 Park Avenue was closed and demolished in 2018, JPMorgan moved its headquarters temporarily to 383 Madison Avenue; the headquarters was scheduled to be relocated to a new tower at 270 Park Avenue upon the structure's scheduled completion in 2025.

History

Founding and early history

Chemical Bank’s roots lie in the 1823 foundation of the New York Chemical Manufacturing Company by Balthazar P. Melick and directors John C. Morrison, Mark Spenser, Gerardus Post, James Jenkins, William A. Seely, and William Stebbins.  Additionally, Joseph Sampson, although not a director, was among the largest of the original shareholders of the later bank. During the 1820s prospective bankers found that they were more likely to be able to successfully secure a state bank charter if the bank was part of a larger business.  Accordingly, the founders used the manufacturing company (which produced chemicals such as blue vitriol, alum, nitric acid, camphor, and saltpeter, as well as medicines, paints, and dyes) as a means of securing a charter from the New York State legislature. In April 1824 the company amended its charter to allow Chemical to enter into banking, creating a separate division for the new activity.  Melick was named the first president of the bank, which catered to merchants in New York City.

In 1826, John Mason became a shareholder of the bank and would serve as Chemical's second president.  Mason, who would later be referred to as "the father of the Chemical Bank" and was one of the richest merchants of his day in New York, succeeded Baltus Melick in 1831.  Mason was responsible for establishing the highly conservative business culture of the young bank that would persist for nearly 90 years.  For its first twenty-five years, the bank paid no dividends, nor did it pay interest on customer deposits.  Mason was also responsible for leading Chemical through the Panic of 1837.  When a speculative bubble collapsed on May 10, 1837, banks suspended payment of gold and silver  specie. Although in the 1837 crisis Chemical followed others in suspending payments, they stood alone in the Panic of 1857, when they continued to make payments in specie. Even in 1837, Chemical was still one of the earliest to resume payments in specie.

Mason died on September 26, 1839, but his legacy of conservatism was taken on by his successors.  Isaac Jones and later his cousin John Quentin Jones would lead Chemical, both serving as president, across the next forty years through 1878.  Both Isaac and John Jones had close connections to John Mason, particularly Isaac who married one of John Mason's three daughters.  The Mason and Jones families would maintain effective control of Chemical for much of its first five decades.  John Q. Jones was succeeded in 1878 by George G. Williams, who had joined the bank in 1842 and served as cashier of the bank from 1855 onward.  In that position, Williams was also inculcated in Chemical's conservative style of banking.  Williams would serve as president from 1878 through 1903.

In 1844, when New York Chemical Manufacturing Company's original charter expired, the chemical company was liquidated and was reincorporated as a bank only, becoming the Chemical Bank of New York in 1844.  Among the bank's first directors under its new charter were Cornelius Roosevelt, John D. Wolfe, Isaac Platt, and Bradish Johnson, as well as bank president John Q. Jones.  The company sold all remaining inventories from the chemical division as well as the corresponding real-estate holdings by 1851.

Two years later, in 1853, Chemical became a charter member of the New York Clearing House, the first and largest bank clearing house in the U.S.  Two Chemical presidents would also serve as head of the clearing house, with John Q. Jones serving from 1865–1871 and George G. Williams serving in 1886 and from 1893–1894.

During the Panic of 1857, Chemical Bank earned the nickname "Old Bullion" by taking a stand that it would continue to redeem its bank notes in specie throughout the crisis.  The panic, which had hit banks and caused a number of failures, led banks across the country to suspend specie payments and turn to issuing paper promissory notes.  Chemical's decision was highly unpopular among its fellow banks and led to the bank's temporary suspension from the New York Clearing House, of which Chemical was a charter member.  While hundreds of banks closed, including 18 banks in New York in a single day, Chemical developed a reputation for stability.  This reputation proved extremely important in Chemical's growth during subsequent recessions during the 1860s.  Chemical frequently used the refrain "Good as gold then, good as gold today" in advertisements from the 1860s well into the 20th century.

Chemical received its national charter as the Chemical National Bank of New York in 1865, at the urging of the secretary of the treasury.  This allowed Chemical to issue government-backed national bank notes, the forerunner to paper money. By the early 1870s, Chemical had accumulated deposits in excess of $6 million (equivalent to $ million in ).

A contemporary perspective of Chemical from 1893 described the bank as follows:

1900–1946

By the first decade of the 20th century, Chemical had one of the strongest reputations in banking but as a business was in decline, losing accounts each year.  Unlike many of its peers, Chemical had been reluctant to expand into securities and other businesses and had not paid interest on bank accounts.  Both practices, considered to be highly conservative, had allowed Chemical to develop a large capital reserve but were not attracting customers.  William H. Porter, a prominent banker of the era, was named president of the bank in 1903 after the death of the previous president George G. Williams.  Porter would leave Chemical seven years later to become a partner at J.P. Morgan & Co. in 1910 and was succeeded by Joseph B. Martindale, who was named president in 1911.

In 1917, Chemical named a new president of the bank, Herbert Twitchell, after the death of Joseph B. Martindale.  It was uncovered, just months after Martindale's death, that the former Chemical president had stolen as much as $300,000 from the account of Ellen D. Hunt, a niece of Wilson G. Hunt.

Twitchell initiated a major turnaround of Chemical, setting up a trust business and reversing Chemical's policy of not paying interest on cash accounts.   These steps along with other initiatives, resulted in an increase in deposits from $35 million to $81 million by 1920.  In 1920, Twitchell was succeeded by Percy H. Johnston and remained with the bank as chairman of the board. Johnston would hold the presidency of the bank through 1946 at which time the bank had grown to become the seventh largest in the U.S.

In 1920, Chemical completed its first major acquisition, merging with Citizens National Bank.  The acquisition of Citizens National, a small New York commercial bank, increased Chemical's assets to more than $200 million with  more than $140 million of deposits.  In 1923, Chemical established its first branch and by the end of the 1920s had opened a dozen branches in Manhattan and Brooklyn as well as a branch in London, its first international presence.

In 1929, Chemical reincorporated as a state bank in New York as Chemical Bank & Trust Company and merged with the United States Mortgage & Trust Company, headquartered on the Madison Avenue and 74th Street.  During the Depression-era of the 1930s, Chemical's deposits grew by more than 40% and in 1941, the bank reached $1 billion of assets.  During this period, Chemical also established Chemical National Company, a securities underwriting business.

1947–1979

In 1947, after the retirement of Percy Johnston, Harold Holmes Helm was named the new president of Chemical and would serve first as president and later as chairman of the bank for the next 18 years until his retirement in 1965.  Under Helm, Chemical completed a series of large mergers in the late 1940s and early 1950s that again made the bank among the largest in the U.S.  In 1947, Chemical merged with Continental Bank and Trust Company.  Then in 1954, Chemical would merge with the Corn Exchange Bank and only five years later merge again with the New York Trust Company.

Chemical completed its largest acquisition to that point, in 1954, merging with the Corn Exchange Bank to become the Chemical Corn Exchange Bank.  Founded in 1853, the Corn Exchange Bank was based in New York City, but had built a network of branches in other states through the acquisition of community banks.  The merger with the Corn Exchange Bank added 98 additional branches to Chemical's system largely in the New York City and $774 million in deposits.

In 1959, the bank, now known as Chemical Corn Exchange Bank, merged with New York Trust Company, effectively doubling the size of the company.  New York Trust Company, which had a large trust and wholesale-banking business, specialized in servicing large industrial accounts. At the time of the merger, Chemical Corn was the fourth largest bank in New York and New York Trust was the ninth largest bank and the merger created the third largest bank in New York, and the fourth largest in the U.S. with $3.8 billion of assets.  Following the merger, the bank dropped the usage of the "corn exchange" from the corporate name to become the Chemical Bank New York Trust Company.

In 1968, Chemical reorganized itself as a bank holding company, Chemical New York Corporation, which allowed for more rapid expansion.  Throughout the early 1960s Chemical had begun to expand into New York's suburbs, opening branches on Long Island and in Westchester County.  However, by the late 1960s and early 1970s, Chemical was focused on building its international business.  In these years, Chemical opened new offices in Frankfurt, Germany (1969), Zurich, Switzerland (1971), Brussels, Belgium (1971), Paris, France  (1971) and Tokyo, Japan (1972).

In 1975, Chemical acquired Security National Bank, which had a branch network on Long Island.

1980s

Chemical continued pursuing acquisitions, throughout the 1980s notably its acquisitions of Texas Commerce Bank (1986) and Horizon Bancorp (1986) as well as its attempted takeover of Florida National Bank (1982).

Chemical and Florida National Bank agreed, in 1982, to enter into a merger, after laws preventing interstate banking were lifted, giving Chemical an option to acquire the business.  In February, 1982, Southeast Banking Corporation (SBC), which had been rebuffed in its attempted to acquire Florida National sued to obtain an injunction against the Chemical merger.  In early 1983, Southeast Banking Corporation dropped its takeover attempt and agreed to exchange their Florida National shares for 24 FNB branch offices and other consideration.  Following the deal with SBC, Florida National was cleared to merge with Chemical, however interstate banking acquisitions were still prohibited by Federal law and required state legislative approval.  With the 1990 deadline running out for its option to buy Florida National and no sign of state legislative approval, Chemical Bank sold their 4.9% interest to First Union Corporation for $115 million.

Chemical completed its largest transaction of the 1980s in December 1986, when the bank agreed to acquire Texas Commerce Bank.  The $1.1 billion transaction represented the largest interstate banking merger in U.S. history to that time.  Texas Commerce, which was officially acquired in May 1987, was one of the largest bank holding companies in the Southwestern U.S., with a strong presence in corporate banking for small and medium-sized businesses.  Chemical did not seek Federal Deposit Insurance Corporation backing for its acquisition of Texas Commerce although other large Texas banks, First RepublicBank Corporation (Acquired by NationsBank) and MCorp Bank (acquired by Bank One), received over $5 billion of support.  Ultimately Chemical contributed $300 million to shore Texas Commerce as it continued to suffer losses.

Also in 1986, Chemical agreed to a merger with New Jersey-based Horizon Bancorp, although the merger was not completed until 1989, due again to interstate banking rules.

The bank's holding company, Chemical New York Corporation, was renamed the Chemical Banking Corporation in 1988 following its series of out of state mergers and acquisitions, including Texas Commerce Bank and Horizon Bancorp.

It was during this period, in the 1980s and early 1990s, that Chemical emerged as one of the leaders in the financing of leveraged buyout transactions.  By the late 1980s, Chemical developed its reputation for financing buyouts, building a syndicated leveraged finance business and related advisory businesses under the auspices of pioneering investment banker, Jimmy Lee.  It was not until 1993 that Chemical would receive permission to underwrite corporate bonds, however within a few years, Chemical (and later Chase) became a major underwriter of below-investment-grade debt under Lee.  Additionally, in 1984, Chemical launched Chemical Venture Partners to invest in private equity transactions alongside various financial sponsors.

1990s
In July 1991, Chemical announced that it would acquire Manufacturers Hanover Corporation in a $135 billion merger transaction.  At the time of the merger, Chemical and Manufacturers Hanover were the sixth and ninth largest banks, respectively, by assets.  The transaction, when it closed at the end of 1991, made the combined bank, which retained the Chemical name, the second largest bank in the U.S., behind Citicorp both in terms of assets and customers (approximately 1.2 million household accounts in 1991).  Chemical adopted Manufacturers Hanover's logo design and moved into its headquarters at 270 Park Avenue in New York.  In corporate banking, Manufacturers Hanover was better established with larger, blue-chip companies, whereas Chemical had been stronger with small- and medium-sized businesses.

Nationally, the combined Chemical Bank became one of the largest lenders to U.S. companies and was arguably the leader in loan syndication globally.  Additionally, Chemical took a leading role providing foreign exchange, interest rate and currency swaps, corporate finance services, cash management, corporate and institutional trust, trade services and funds transfer. Chemical operated one of the nation's largest bank credit card franchises and was a major originator and servicer of home mortgages.

In 1996, Chemical acquired Chase Manhattan Corporation in a merger valued at $10 billion to create the largest financial institution in the United States.  Although Chemical was the acquiring company and the nominal survivor, the merged bank adopted the Chase name, which was considered to be better known, particularly internationally.  Chase, which at its height had been the largest bank in the U.S., had fallen to sixth, while Chemical was the third largest bank at the time of the merger.  The merger resulted in the reduction of more than 12,000 jobs between the two banks and merger related expenses of approximately $1.9 billion.

The bank continued to operate under the Chase brand until its acquisition of J.P. Morgan & Co. in December 2000 to form JPMorgan Chase & Co.  Throughout all of these acquisitions, Chemical's original management team, led by Walter V. Shipley, remained in charge of the bank.  When the combined bank purchased J.P. Morgan & Co., William B. Harrison, Jr., who had been a longtime Chemical executive, was named CEO of the combined firm.  Additionally, many of Chemical's businesses remained intact through the various mergers.  Chemical's private equity group for example, was renamed multiple times, ultimately becoming JP Morgan Partners before completing a spin-out from the bank, as CCMP Capital, after the bank's 2004 merger with Bank One.  Additionally, JPMorgan Chase retains Chemical's pre-1996 stock price history, as well as Chemical's old headquarters at 270 Park Avenue.

Acquisition history

Electronic banking
Chemical was among the pioneers of electronic online banking.  On September 2, 1969, Chemical installed the first automated teller machine (ATM) at its branch in Rockville Centre, New York.  The first ATMs were designed to dispense a fixed amount of cash when a user inserted a specially coded card.  A Chemical Bank advertisement boasted "On Sept. 2 our bank will open at 9:00 and never close again."  Chemical's ATM, initially known as a Docuteller, was designed by Donald Wetzel and his company Docutel.  Chemical executives were initially hesitant about the electronic banking transition given the high cost of the early machines.  Additionally, executives were concerned that customers would resist having machines handling their money.

In 1982, Chemical initiated the first personal computer based banking system when it launched a pilot electronic banking program called Pronto.  Chemical had spent $20 million to develop the software for Pronto.  The system, which worked with the Atari console, began in New York and served 200 Chemical Bank customers. Pronto was an extension of other electronic banking services offered by Chemical that  included a corporate cash-management system and its growing ATM network and was one of the largest early forays by a bank into home computer based banking.  However, a year after launching Pronto only 21,000 of Chemical's 1.15 million customers were using the system, in large part due to the high monthly subscription costs that Chemical charged customers to use it.  By 1985, it was clear that Pronto, which was heavily promoted by Chemical, was growing much slower than anticipated.

In 1985, Chemical and BankAmerica, another pioneer in electronic banking, entered into a joint venture with AT&T Corporation and Time Inc., known as Covidea, to market banking and discount stock-brokerage services to computer-equipped households.  By combining resources and sharing costs, the four firms hoped to reduce the risk of large and protracted losses.  Eventually Chemical discontinued its efforts in 1989 at a loss of nearly $30 million.

Notable employees and executives

Executives and directors
 Earl C. Sandmeyer, a founder of the New York Society of Security Analysts, New York Financial Writers Association, International Public Relations Association (IPRA), Public Relations Society, Public Relations Society of America, Public Utilities Advertising Association, Newcomen Society, Christ Church Day School, Corporate Intelligence, Inc. public relations and publishing, and Lifelighters' Associates record company, financial editor of the Rochester Times-Union from 1929 to 1933, financial editor and columnist of the Gannett newspapers in Rochester from 1933 to 1938, and financial writer for the New York Herald Tribune from 1938 to 1940.
 William B. Harrison, Jr., later CEO of JPMorgan Chase
 James B. Lee, Jr., investment banker and senior executive at JPMorgan Chase, notable for his role in the development of the leveraged finance markets in the U.S.
 Robert I. Lipp, partner of Brysam Global Partners, a private equity firm, and former member of the board of JPMorgan Chase
 John McGillicuddy, former chairman and CEO of Manufacturers Hanover
 John Mason, early shareholder and second president of Chemical Bank
 Balthazar P. Melick, founder and first president of Chemical Bank
 John L. Notter, international financier and developer, former director
 Cornelius Roosevelt, original director of Chemical Bank of New York when it was rechartered in 1844
 Emlen Roosevelt, cousin of Theodore Roosevelt and president of Roosevelt & Son
 James A. Roosevelt, uncle of Theodore Roosevelt and founder of Roosevelt & Son
 Walter V. Shipley, former chairman and CEO of Chemical and later Chase Manhattan Bank and chairman of JPMorgan Chase

Other former employees

 Henry B. R. Brown, the originator of the world's first money market fund
 Granger K. Costikyan, founder of Costikyan Freres
 Alan H. Fishman, the last CEO of Washington Mutual before the bank was seized in 2008
 Ford M. Fraker, former ambassador to Saudi Arabia
 Christopher C. Ashby, former ambassador to Uruguay
 Abraham George, businessman, academic, and philanthropist and founder of The George Foundation
 Glenn Hutchins, founder of Silver Lake Partners
 Kathryn V. Marinello, former president and CEO of Ceridian Corporation
 Darla Moore, partner of Rainwater, Inc. and wife of Richard Rainwater
 Nancy Naples, director of Amtrak
 Peggy Post, American author and consultant on etiquette
 Pat Toomey, United States senator from Pennsylvania
 Kathleen Waldron, an American author, financial executive and educator

References

Sources

 History of the Chemical Bank: 1823–1913.  1913
 Funding Universe History of Chemical Bank
 Chemical New York Corp..  Lehman Brothers Collections – Twentieth Century Business Archives, Harvard Business School

Defunct banks of the United States
Banks established in 1823
Banks disestablished in 1996
JPMorgan Chase
Banks based in New York City
Defunct companies based in New York City
American companies established in 1823
American companies disestablished in 1996
1823 establishments in New York (state)
1996 disestablishments in New York (state)